Lee Yun-pyo (born 4 September 1984) is a South Korean footballer who plays as defender for Incheon United.

External links

1984 births
Living people
South Korean footballers
K League 1 players
Jeonnam Dragons players
Daejeon Hana Citizen FC players
FC Seoul players
Incheon United FC players
Association football defenders